The Kuching Civic Centre ) is a major landmark in Kuching, Sarawak, Malaysia. The building was officially opened on 1 August 1988 following the proclamation of Kuching as a city status.

Features
The viewing platform at the top of the futuristic Civic Centre tower offers the best all-round views of Kuching and the surrounding areas. The city and its hinterland, Mount Serapi, Mount Santubong and even the mountains of Kalimantan are visible on a clear day.

References

Buildings and structures in Kuching
1988 establishments in Malaysia
Tourist attractions in Kuching